Theo Phelan (12 September 1908 – 7 April 1970) was an Irish athlete. He competed in the men's triple jump at the 1928 Summer Olympics.

References

1908 births
1970 deaths
Athletes (track and field) at the 1928 Summer Olympics
Irish male triple jumpers
Olympic athletes of Ireland
Place of birth missing